Thomas Jack "T.J." Burke KC (born 1972) is a New Brunswick lawyer and former politician.

Burke made history when he was elected becoming the first member of Aboriginal heritage elected to a legislature anywhere in Atlantic Canada. He served in the Legislative Assembly of New Brunswick from 2003-2010 and was a member of the executive council from 2006 to 2009 by serving as Minister of Justice and Attorney General.

Burke was born in Los Angeles, California. His family returned to Canada in 1978, and he was raised in Fredericton, New Brunswick. He graduated from Fredericton High School in 1990. After high school, Burke enlisted in the United States Military where he served from 1991 to 1995 as a paratrooper with the 82nd Airborne Division, one of America's elite military units. Following his service in the U.S. military, Burke again returned to Canada and completed a Bachelor of Arts at the University of New Brunswick (New Brunswick) and a law degree at Dalhousie University. He practiced law in Fredericton until he was named to the Provincial cabinet.

Burke received national attention on December 15, 2005, when the legislature unanimously passed his tireless work and dedication on creating a motion declaring 2006 the "Year of the War Bride".

On September 28, 2010, Burke was defeated by Progressive Conservative candidate Troy Lifford and lost his seat in the Legislature.

Since his departure from politics, Burke has become one of New Brunswick's prominent criminal law defence lawyers and out of court room negotiators. He is regarded by many of his peers as a tireless advocate for the wrongfully accused and relentless defence lawyer in the court room. Burke was appointed and served a term as Canada's Chief Federal Negotiator on an important legal file.

Burke has argued successful cases before all level of court including  the Supreme Court of Canada. He has received various academic and public awards through law and politics, such as the Queen's Diamond Jubilee Awards.  He has taught courses at both St. Thomas University and the University of New Brunswick's law school and is a recipient of the Queen's Counsel designation, a special recognition reserved for senior members of the legal community, who have distinguished themselves in their areas of legal practise.

References

1972 births
Canadian people of American descent
Schulich School of Law alumni
First Nations politicians
Lawyers in New Brunswick
Living people
Members of the Executive Council of New Brunswick
New Brunswick Liberal Association MLAs
Politicians from Fredericton
Politicians from Los Angeles
United States Marines
21st-century Canadian politicians
Attorneys General of New Brunswick
Paratroopers